Muhigan Mountain is a  mountain located in Alberta, Canada.

Description
The mountain is set within Jasper National Park, in the Trident Range of the Canadian Rockies. The peak is composed of sedimentary rock laid down from the Precambrian to the Jurassic periods and pushed east and over the top of younger rock during the Laramide orogeny. Precipitation runoff from Muhigan Mountain drains into tributaries of the Miette River. Topographic relief is significant as the summit rises 1,575 meters (5,167 feet) above the river in four kilometers (2.5 miles).

History
The mountain was named in 1916 by Morrison P. Bridgland, and the word "muhigan" is Indigenous, meaning "wolf". In Cree language, the mountain is called "Mahikan Wachi" (Wolf Mountain). Bridgland (1878–1948), was a Dominion Land Surveyor who named many peaks in Jasper Park and the Canadian Rockies. The mountain's toponym was officially adopted in 1951 by the Geographical Names Board of Canada.

Climate
Based on the Köppen climate classification, Muhigan Mountain is located in a subarctic climate zone with cold, snowy winters, and mild summers. Winter temperatures can drop below  with wind chill factors below .

See also
 
 Geography of Alberta

Gallery

References

External links
 Muhigan Mountain: weather forecast
 Parks Canada web site: Jasper National Park

Two-thousanders of Alberta
Mountains of Jasper National Park
Canadian Rockies
Alberta's Rockies